The Baleroy Mansion is a 32-room estate located in the historic and affluent Chestnut Hill section of Philadelphia, Pennsylvania, in the United States. It has obtained the title of "Most Haunted Home in America" due to its alleged infestation of spirits, ghosts, jinns, demons, angels or other supernatural beings. The mansion has been featured in a number of TV shows and books that deal with haunted houses. Others have described it as "the most haunted house in Philadelphia". The name "Baleroy" was chosen by its owner George Meade Easby, great-grandson of General George Meade (hero of the Battle of Gettysburg during the American Civil War). The estate's name was likely derived from Balleroy in France.

History
The mansion or its separate carriage house was originally built in 1911. The first owner was a carpenter who is said to have murdered his wife inside the main house. It was purchased in 1926 by "a family that traces its roots to Easby Abbey in 12th Century Yorkshire, England; that crossed over to America in 1683 aboard the Welcome with William Penn, and that counts among its descendants three - 'at least three that I know of,' says Easby - signers of the Declaration of Independence." Baleroy housed many antique pieces that were handed down by famous historical people, including Napoleon of France, U.S. General George Meade, Thomas Jefferson, and others.

After the Easbys moved into this large and spacious estate in 1926, George Meade Easby and his younger brother (May Stevenson Easby, Jr., 1920-1931) were playing one day in the courtyard of the mansion and laughing at their reflections in the main courtyard fountain, when Steven's reflection turned into a skull. George's reflection was normal. Steven died in 1931 from an undetermined childhood disease. This greatly devastated George and his parents, but they continued living in the mansion for the rest of their lives. They along with their housekeepers and visitors have experienced many hauntings throughout the years.

George's mother died in 1962 at the age of about 82 and his father died in 1969, reaching about 90. Following their deaths Easby began to hire housekeepers to do general work in and around the mansion. However, none of the workers lived with him. In July 1992, Baleroy Mansion was burglarized by a very skillful thief. An estimated $202,000 worth of antiques were carefully stolen without ransacking or leaving a sign of forced entry. The police who were investigating the incident stated, "The thief seemed to know what he was looking for and where it was kept." In an article dated April 3, 1999, in the Inquirer Magazine, "Easby tells a chilling tale of waking up and feeling someone clutching his arm. When he turned on the light, no one was there."

In July 2012, indie rock band The Walkmen shot a music video for their song "The Love You Love" at Baleroy. The band was looking for a unique location to support the surreal nature of the video and witnessed some unexplainable events while there.

Death of George Meade Easby 
George Meade Easby died on 11 December 2005, at the age of 87. On July 9, 2012, Baleroy Mansion was sold after all antiques were sold at auction or donated to local museums. Most of Easby's antique cars have been sold in recent years. They include the 1954 Rolls-Royce Silver Wraith which was previously owned by Prince Aly Khan, husband of the American actress Rita Hayworth and father of Aga Khan IV, and Easby's first automobile, the 1935 Packard Super Eight which was sold for $110,000. A number of other antique items belonging to Easby have also been sold through auctions.

Hauntings

George Meade Easby allegedly first experienced paranormal activity shortly after moving into Baleroy Mansion, before the death of his playful young brother Steven. The string or rope on the back of the portrait and the hook on the wall were reported to be still intact. Steven's full-body spirit has been said to haunt his room and that Easby supposedly encountered it when he was a child. A number of people have claimed to have seen the ghost of Steven lurking around them. David Beltz and a co-worker were busy working outside in the back of the house when they claimed to see young Steven looking at them from inside the house. Beltz stated: "I noticed a person looking out the window at me, a young kid with blond hair. He had his hands on the sill and was looking down toward the yard. I said to my buddy, 'Look at that little kid.' Then it just faded off and my buddy said, 'Man, that was really strange.'" The co-worker refused to work at Baleroy again. According to Beltz, the co-worker "would never come back. He was really scared. He just said that he felt somebody stare at him all the time."

One of the other alleged ghosts is said to be Easby's mother, Henrietta Meade Large Easby (1880-1962), who was described as "prim and reserved, a Victorian lady of few words". Psychic Judith Richardson Haimes claimed that she established communication with Easby's mother and some of the other ghosts of Baleroy. The ghost of Thomas Jefferson reportedly haunts the dining room, standing beside a tall grandfather clock. Most of the furniture in the dining room belonged to General George Meade and were passed down to Easby's mother, including a large dining table.

Another claimed ghost is an unknown elderly woman that reportedly walks the upstairs hallway with a cane. Family members and guests were toyed with by the spirits, and it was never uncommon to hear knocking and unexplained footsteps. A respected minister was hit by a flying antique pot that flew like a missile. Electrical fields in the house also attract lightning, and the electricity would go off for no reason. People, including family members, housekeepers, visitors, and even renovators, claim to have seen these ghosts. Others have allegedly seen or heard 1930s phantom cars that drove up the long and narrow driveway into the estate's parking area, but when they went to look there was nothing to see.

Blue room and the chair of death
In the infamous blue room of the mansion, a 200-year-old blue chair known as the "chair of death" is said to be cursed. It has been said that when someone sits in it, the person dies. About four people are said to have died, and Easby then banned people from sitting in the chair. The chair was said to be owned by Napoleon. It has been said that the chair is haunted by the ghost of Amanda, a red mist that is said to kill people who sit in the chair. The chair is said to have been made by an evil warlock in the 18th/19th century.

Tours
Although Baleroy was once open to tours showcasing its large collection of antiques, the antiques have been removed and the property is now a private home. Public tours are currently unavailable.

See also
 Reportedly haunted locations in Pennsylvania

References

External links
 The Baleroy Mansion
 Baleroy Mansion - Chestnut Hill, PA
 BALEROY By: Easby; George G. Meade

Houses in Philadelphia
Reportedly haunted locations in Philadelphia
Residential buildings completed in 1911